Rodaan Al Galidi (born 1971) is a Dutch writer of Iraqi descent. A trained engineer, he fled his native Iraq and came to the Netherlands in 1998. Al Galidi writes both prose and poetry in Dutch, a language he taught himself. His novel De autist en de postduif (The autist and the carrier-pigeon) won the EU Prize for Literature.

He is also the author of Two Blankets, Three Sheets, which is a fictionalized account of his emigration experiences.

Publication in English
 Rodhan Al-Khalidi: Thirsty river. Liverstock, Aflame, 2009.

References

1971 births
Living people
Dutch novelists
21st-century Iraqi novelists
Iraqi emigrants to the Netherlands